The Municipality of Vransko is a municipality in the traditional region of Styria in northeastern Slovenia. The seat of the municipality is the town of Vransko. Vransko became a municipality in 1998.

Settlements

In addition to the municipal seat of Vransko, the municipality also includes the following settlements:

 Brode
 Čeplje
 Čreta
 Jeronim
 Limovce
 Ločica pri Vranskem
 Prapreče
 Prekopa
 Selo pri Vranskem
 Stopnik
 Tešova
 Vologa
 Zahomce
 Zajasovnik
 Zaplanina

References

External links

Municipality of Vransko on Geopedia
Municipality of Vransko website

Vransko
1998 establishments in Slovenia